Madanbhai sura institute of business management (Marathi : MSIBM) is an Institute of Management in Khed, Ratnagiri, India. Established in 2008, it is affiliated to the University of Mumbai. The school is academically and financially autonomous and is run by the Bansilal Ramanath Agrawal Charitable Trust. The director is Dr. Prasad S.Bhanage

The college has attained academic autonomy from the academic year 2008–09. It is the first private college in Maharashtra to do so. Academic autonomy has helped the college to introduce cross-departmental and industry-oriented subjects in the curriculum. The college is the only college in Pune to provide Honors and Minors course in addition to a normal undergraduate course.

The college is situated in the Khonde area of Khed, Maharashtra.

References

Business schools in Maharashtra
Affiliates of the University of Mumbai
Ratnagiri district
Educational institutions established in 2008
2008 establishments in Maharashtra